The Dreaming, also referred to as Dreamtime, is a term devised by early anthropologists to refer to a religio-cultural worldview attributed to Australian Aboriginal beliefs. It was originally used by Francis Gillen, quickly adopted by his colleague Baldwin Spencer and thereafter popularised by A. P. Elkin, who, however, later revised his views.

The Dreaming is used to represent Aboriginal concepts of Everywhen, during which the land was inhabited by ancestral figures, often of heroic proportions or with supernatural abilities. These figures were often distinct from gods, as they did not control the material world and were not worshipped but only revered. The concept of the Dreamtime has subsequently become widely adopted beyond its original Australian context and is now part of global popular culture.

The term is based on a rendition of the Arandic word , used by the Aranda (Arunta, Arrernte) people of Central Australia, although it has been argued that it is based on a misunderstanding or mistranslation. Some scholars suggest that the word's meaning is closer to "eternal, uncreated". Anthropologist William Stanner said that the concept was best understood by non-Aboriginal people as "a complex of meanings". Jukurrpa is a widespread term used by Warlpiri people and other peoples of the Western Desert cultural bloc.

By the 1990s, Dreaming had acquired its own currency in popular culture, based on idealised or fictionalised conceptions of Australian mythology. Since the 1970s, Dreaming has also returned from academic usage via popular culture and tourism and is now ubiquitous in the English vocabulary of Aboriginal Australians in a kind of "self-fulfilling academic prophecy".

Etymology
The station-master, magistrate, and amateur ethnographer Francis Gillen first used the terms in an ethnographical report in 1896. With Walter Baldwin Spencer, Gillen published a major work, Native Tribes of Central Australia, in 1899. In that work, they spoke of the Alcheringa as "the name applied to the far distant past with which the earliest traditions of the tribe deal". Five years later, in their Northern Tribes of Central Australia, they gloss the far distant age as "the dream times", link it to the word  meaning 'dream', and affirm that the term is current also among the Kaitish and Unmatjera.

Altjira
Early doubts about the precision of Spencer and Gillen's English gloss were expressed by the German Lutheran pastor and missionary Carl Strehlow in his 1908 book Die Aranda (The Arrernte). He noted that his Arrente contacts explained altjira, whose etymology was unknown, as an eternal being who had no beginning. Strehlow theorised that the noun is the somewhat rare word , which Spencer and Gillen gave a corrupted transcription and a false etymology. "The native," Strehlow concluded, "knows nothing of 'dreamtime' as a designation of a certain period of their history."

Strehlow describes him as a tall strong man with red skin, long fair hair, and emu legs, with many red-skinned wives (with dog legs) and children. In Strehlow's account, Altjira lives in the sky (which is a body of land through which runs the Milky Way, a river).

However, by the time Strehlow was writing, his contacts had been converts to Christianity for decades, and critics suggested that Altjira had been used by missionaries as a word for the Christian God.

In 1926, Spencer conducted a field study to challenge Strehlow's conclusion about Altjira and the implied criticism of Gillen and Spencer's original work.

Academic Sam Gill finds Strehlow's use of Altjira ambiguous, sometimes describing a supreme being, and sometimes describing a totem being but not necessarily a supreme one. He attributes the clash partly to Spencer's cultural evolutionist beliefs that Aboriginal people were at a pre-religion "stage" of development (and thus could not believe in a supreme being), while Strehlow as a Christian missionary found presence of belief in the divine a useful entry point for proselytising.

Linguist David Campbell Moore is critical of Spencer and Gillen's "Dreamtime" translation, concluding:

Other terms
The complex of religious beliefs encapsulated by the Dreamings are also called:

 Ngarrankarni or Ngarrarngkarni by the Gija people
 Jukurrpa or Tjukurpa/Tjukurrpa by the Warlpiri people and in the Pitjantjatjara dialect
 Ungud or Wungud by the Ngarinyin people
 Manguny in the language Martu Wangka
 Wongar in North-East Arnhem Land
 Daramoolen in Ngunnawal language and Ngarigo language
 Nura in the Dharug language
 Nyitting in the Noongar language

Translations and meaning
In English, anthropologists have variously translated words normally understood to mean Dreaming or Dreamtime in a variety of other ways, including "Everywhen", "world-dawn", "ancestral past", "ancestral present", "ancestral now" (satirically), "unfixed in time", "abiding events" or "abiding law".

Most translations of the Dreaming into other languages are based on the translation of the word dream.

The concept of the Dreaming is inadequately explained by English terms, and difficult to explain in terms of non-Aboriginal cultures. It has been described as "an all-embracing concept that provides rules for living, a moral code, as well as rules for interacting with the natural environment ... [it] provides for a total, integrated way of life ... a lived daily reality". It embraces past, present and future. Another definition suggests that it represents "the relationship between people, plants, animals and the physical features of the land; the knowledge of how these relationships came to be, what they mean and how they need to be maintained in daily life and in ceremony". According to Simon Wright, "jukurrpa has an expansive meaning for Warlpiri people, encompassing their own law and related cultural knowledge systems, along with what non-Indigenous people refer to as 'dreaming

A dreaming is often associated with a particular place, and may also belong to specific ages, gender or skin groups. Dreamings may be represented in artworks, for example "Pikilyi Jukurrpa" by Theo (Faye) Nangala represents the Dreaming of Pikilyi (Vaughan Springs) in the Northern Territory, and belongs to the Japanangka/ Nanpanangka and Japangardi/ Napanangka skin groups.

Aboriginal beliefs and culture

Related entities are known as Mura-mura by the Dieri and as Tjukurpa in Pitjantjatjara.

"Dreaming" is now also used as a term for a system of totemic symbols, so that an Aboriginal person may "own" a specific Dreaming, such as Kangaroo Dreaming, Shark Dreaming, Honey Ant Dreaming, Badger Dreaming, or any combination of Dreamings pertinent to their country. This is because in the Dreaming an individual's entire ancestry exists as one, culminating in the idea that all worldly knowledge is accumulated through one's ancestors. Many Aboriginal Australians also refer to the world-creation time as "Dreamtime". The Dreaming laid down the patterns of life for the Aboriginal people.

Creation is believed to be the work of culture heroes who travelled across a formless land, creating sacred sites and significant places of interest in their travels. The dreaming and travelling trails of these heroic spirit beings are the songlines. The signs of the spirit beings may be of spiritual essence, physical remains such as petrosomatoglyphs of body impressions or footprints, among natural and elemental simulacra.

Some of the ancestor or spirit beings inhabiting the Dreamtime become one with parts of the landscape, such as rocks or trees. The concept of a life force is also often associated with sacred sites, and ceremonies performed at such sites "are a re-creation of the events which created the site during The Dreaming". The ceremony helps the life force at the site to remain active and to keep creating new life: if not performed, new life cannot be created.

Dreaming existed before the life of the individual begins, and continues to exist when the life of the individual ends. Both before and after life, it is believed that this spirit-child exists in the Dreaming and is only initiated into life by being born through a mother. The spirit of the child is culturally understood to enter the developing fetus during the fifth month of pregnancy. When the mother felt the child move in the womb for the first time, it was thought that this was the work of the spirit of the land in which the mother then stood. Upon birth, the child is considered to be a special custodian of that part of their country and is taught the stories and songlines of that place. As Wolf (1994: p. 14) states: "A 'black fella' may regard his totem or the place from which his spirit came as his Dreaming. He may also regard tribal law as his Dreaming."

In the Wangga genre, the songs and dances express themes related to death and regeneration. They are performed publicly with the singer composing from their daily lives or while Dreaming of a nyuidj (dead spirit).

Dreaming stories vary throughout Australia, with variations on the same theme. The meaning and significance of particular places and creatures is wedded to their origin in The Dreaming, and certain places have a particular potency or Dreaming. For example, the story of how the sun was made is different in New South Wales and in Western Australia. Stories cover many themes and topics, as there are stories about creation of sacred places, land, people, animals and plants, law and custom. In Perth, the Noongar believe that the Darling Scarp is the body of the Wagyl – a serpent being that meandered over the land creating rivers, waterways and lakes and who created the Swan River. In another example, the Gagudju people of Arnhemland, for which Kakadu National Park is named, believe that the sandstone escarpment that dominates the park's landscape was created in the Dreamtime when Ginga (the crocodile-man) was badly burned during a ceremony and jumped into the water to save himself.

See also

 Dreaming (Australian Aboriginal art)
 Aboriginal mythology
 Rainbow Serpent
 Tjilbruke
 Apeiron, the concept of the eternal or unlimited in Greek philosophy
 Wuji (philosophy) and Taiji (philosophy), concepts of the eternal or limitless in Chinese philosophy
 The Dreaming (1982 album by Kate Bush)

Notes

Citations

Sources

("Into the Crystal Dreamtime", promotional pamphlet, late 1980s; "Crystal Woman: isters of the Dreamtime" 1987; p. 36:"the prescriptive New Age genre, which sells one-hundred-proof ethnological antimodernism without overmuch worry about bothersome ethnographic facts")

Further reading

Australian Aboriginal mythology
Creation myths